Hollandsworth is a surname. Notable people with the surname include:

Roy Hollandsworth (born 1942), American politician
Skip Hollandsworth (born 1957), American journalist
Todd Hollandsworth (born 1973), American baseball player